Messages is an instant messaging software application developed by Apple Inc. for its macOS, iOS, iPadOS, and watchOS operating systems.

The mobile version of Messages on iOS used on iPhone and iPad also supports SMS and MMS due to replacing the older text messaging Text app since iPhone OS 3. Users can tell the difference between a message sent via SMS and one sent over iMessage as the bubbles will appear either green (SMS) or blue (iMessage).

The desktop Messages application replaced iChat as the native OS X instant messaging client with the release of OS X Mountain Lion in July 2012. While it inherits the majority of iChat's features, Messages also brings support for iMessage, Apple's messaging service for iOS, as well as FaceTime integration.

iOS and iPadOS versions
Apple released Messages for the iPhone as a built-in application with iPhone OS 3.0 on June 17, 2009. It replaced the Text application which had been the native messaging application since the iPhone's inception. The change in name was due to the iPhone gaining native support for the MMS protocol, in addition to the previously available SMS protocol. The original iPhone did not receive support for MMS, citing hardware challenges. Messages also gained support for sharing contacts using the vCard standard. Other changes included support for copy and paste, and the ability to forward or delete multiple messages at a time.

Messages received minor upgrades with iOS 4. Among the new features was the ability to search within text messages, much like the search feature in Mail. It also added support for displaying a character count to notify when one had gone over the standard SMS character limit. iOS 4.0 also included support for a red exclamation mark to appear on the app's icon to warn failure to send a message. Developers were provided with a new API that allowed them to add embedded messaging functionality to their apps.

iMessage support was added with iOS 5 on October 12, 2011. The iPhone supported SMS, MMS and iMessage, while the iPad and iPod touch only supported iMessage. With iMessage, users could send text, picture messages and contacts over WiFi or 3G to other iOS 5 devices without using their carrier quota. In addition, a user could start their conversation on one device and continue on another. Messages also introduced typing indication, delivery and read receipts. With the introduction of Notification Center, new SMS, MMS or iMessages could be seen on the lock screen or by pulling down the Notification Center.

iOS 6 helped improve syncing between multiple devices. iPod touch and iPad users could now use their iPhone phone numbers to send or receive iMessages. Earlier, iPhone users could not receive iMessages sent to their phone number on iPad or iPod touch. Users could now add additional emails to receive and send messages on any device. iOS 6 also added a Share button on apps like Safari and Photos, which enabled users to share links and photos using SMS/MMS or iMessage without leaving the app.

Messages received a new user interface in iOS 7. Apple also allowed users to see a message post date by swiping from right to left. In iOS 8, users can send audio and video messages by holding down the record button. In group conversations, users can remove/add someone to a thread, name a thread, share their location in a thread, view all attachments, and turn on Do Not Disturb to not receive notifications from a specific thread. As a part of the new continuity feature, users can now use their iPhones as a relay to send and receive SMS and MMS messages on Macs and iPads. In iOS 9, the app received a redesigned overlay when sending an audio clip, as well as seeing contact photos in list view on iPhone 6 or later. In iOS 10, the app has its own App Store allowing the user to download third-party apps that allow users to send stickers and play games within the app. It also received new visual effects, for example, chat bubbles with a "loud" or "gentle" effect.

watchOS version
Messages has been included in every version of watchOS on the Apple Watch. Apple Watches can send and receive SMS and MMS messages through a paired iPhone, while iMessages can be sent and received over Wi-Fi without a paired iPhone. As the Apple Watch has no keyboard, users can respond to messages using preset replies or text transcribed by Siri. Apple Watch can also send emojis, audio recordings, and hand-drawn "scribbles".

macOS version 
Messages was announced for OS X as a beta application on February 16, 2012 for Macs running Mac OS X 10.7 "Lion". The stable release of Messages was released on July 25, 2012 with OS X Mountain Lion, replacing iChat. In addition to supporting Apple's new iMessage protocol, Messages retained its support for AIM, Yahoo Messenger, Google Talk and Jabber.

Messages unitizes the newly added Notification Center to notify of incoming messages. The introduction of a new Share button in applications like Safari, Finder and Preview gave users the ability to share links to webpages, photos, and files. Messages also supported dragging and dropping files and photos for sharing. It also supports video calling through Apple's FaceTime and the third-party IM services it supports. With the release of OS X Mountain Lion 10.8.2, Messages gained the ability to send and receive iMessages using an iPhone phone number.

Messages received a major redesign in OS X Yosemite, following the flat design aesthetic introduced in iOS 7. As a part of the new Continuity feature, users can send and receive SMS and MMS messages through paired iPhones running iOS 8 or later.

macOS Big Sur dropped the original codebase in favor of porting the iOS version using Catalyst. This was done to retain feature parity with iOS since before the Mac version lagged behind. Big Sur brought conversation pinning, the ability to mention individuals, message searching, and more tools to send messages such as Memoji.

Reception

Praise
As a headlining feature in iOS 5, Messages was widely reviewed and was met with fairly positive reviews.

Dante Cesa from Engadget, in his review, praised the "brilliance" in Apple's execution of Messages. He complimented the way Messages did not change the earlier SMS UI and would automatically convert an SMS/MMS to iMessage if the recipient was registered; and from iMessage to SMS/MMS if they stopped using the service. Dan Moren from Macworld was also in praise of Apple execution saying that "...there's no having to explain to your less technically savvy friends how they can send you a free message instead of an SMS; it's all done automatically." This feature was widely praised.

AnandTech praised Apple's technical achievements with Messages, particularly with iMessage. They noted that doing away with SMS's character limits (140 or 160) helped eliminate messages being sent and received split up into two or more messages. In their tests they found that Apple actually prioritized using cellular networks to send text messages as opposed to WiFi networks in spite of possibly incurring data costs. They claimed that data usage with text based iMessage was small enough to ignore especially when it is considered that cellular networks are more secure than WiFi (protected or not). With picture or video messages, Apple prioritized WiFi given the much higher data consumption as compared to text.

Criticism 
Most of the criticism for Messages relates to iMessage. Before the release of iOS 6 and OS X Mountain Lion (10.8.2), the inability to receive iMessages sent to iPhone phone numbers on the iPad, iPod touch, and Mac was criticized. This feature was addressed in iOS 6 for iPhones, iPads and iPod touches and OS X 10.8.2 for Macs.

Messages also came under fire due to multiple cases of Apple's iCloud service going down. Messages relies on iCloud to send and receive iMessages.

Accessibility 
Using Apple's VoiceOver screen reader (on both iOS and macOS), visually impaired users can tap on a message and have it be read out to them. They can also navigate the Messages UI using Voice Over. Utilizing Siri with Messages enables one to dictate and send messages with just a few commands. Siri is also able to read out new incoming messages. The default font size on iOS Messages is editable under the Accessibility tab in the Settings application.

See also 

 Comparison of cross-platform instant messaging clients
 Comparison of instant messaging protocols
 Comparison of Internet Relay Chat clients
 Comparison of LAN messengers
 Comparison of VoIP software
 List of SIP software
 List of video telecommunication services and product brands

References 

2007 software
AIM (software) clients
Apple Inc. software
Computer-related introductions in 2007
Instant messaging clients
IOS software
MacOS instant messaging clients
MacOS-only software made by Apple Inc.
MacOS
WatchOS software
XMPP clients
IOS-based software made by Apple Inc.